Lysa Tchaptchet Defo (born 20 December 2001) is a handballer who plays as a pivot for Norwegian club Vipers Kristiansand. Born in Cameroon, she represents the Spain women's national team.

Tchaptchet represented Spain at the 2020 European Women's Handball Championship.

Tchaptchet has a younger sister, Lyndie Tchaptchet Defo, who also play handball in the Spanish Subnational handball team.

Achievements
EHF Champions League:
 Winner: 2021/2022
Norwegian League:
Winner: 2021/2022
Norwegian Cup:
Winner: 2021, 2022/23

References

2001 births
Living people
Sportspeople from Yaoundé
Spanish female handball players
Spanish people of Cameroonian descent
Spanish sportspeople of African descent
Naturalised citizens of Spain